Eriotheca is a genus of flowering plant in the mallow family (Malvaceae) and found in tropical South America.

Species include:

 Eriotheca candolleana
 Eriotheca gracilipes
 Eriotheca pubescens
 Eriotheca peruviana

Eriotheca gracilipes and young trees 

 
Malvaceae genera
Taxonomy articles created by Polbot